Columbarium spiralis is a species of very rare deepwater sea snail, a marine gastropod mollusc in the family Turbinellidae, the pagoda shells.

References
 Powell A. W. B., New Zealand Mollusca, William Collins Publishers Ltd, Auckland, New Zealand 1979 
 Glen Pownall, New Zealand Shells and Shellfish, Seven Seas Publishing Pty Ltd, Wellington, New Zealand 1979 

Turbinellidae
Gastropods of New Zealand
Gastropods described in 1856